Mad Man Blues is a compilation album by blues musician John Lee Hooker, compiling songs recorded dating from 1951-1954 and 1966 and released under the Chess Records label in 1973. The record was reissued in 1982.

Hooker's career revitalized in the 1980s with The Healer, which won a Grammy Award, and occasioned the reissue of much of the Chess catalog remastered from the original 1950s and 1960s recordings. The title track is from an early-1950s recording on the Gone label. "Leave My Wife Alone", "Sugar Mama", "Louise", and "High Priced Woman" are from the 1959 Chess reissue House of the Blues featuring Eddie Kirkland's guitar accompaniment.

It is believed that the songs recorded in 1966 are from the Real Folk Blues sessions, with Hooker backed by variations of Lafayette Leake on piano, Eddie "Guitar" Burns on guitar, an unknown bassist, and S.P. Leary or possibly Fred Below on drums, all previously released on the 1966 album The Real Folk Blues.

Track listing

Personnel
John Lee Hooker – guitar, vocals
Eddie Kirkland – guitar (second guitar) (tracks A4, A6, C1, D3)
Bob Thurman – piano (track B3)

References

John Lee Hooker albums
1973 albums